The following is a list of Michigan State Historic Sites in Wexford County, Michigan. Sites marked with a dagger (†) are also listed on the National Register of Historic Places in Wexford County, Michigan.


Current listings

See also
 National Register of Historic Places listings in Wexford County, Michigan

Sources
 Historic Sites Online – Wexford County. Michigan State Housing Developmental Authority. Accessed January 23, 2011.

References

Wexford County
State Historic Sites
Tourist attractions in Wexford County, Michigan